RNA Biology is the leading peer-reviewed scientific journal in the field of ribonucleic acid (RNA) research. It is indexed for MEDLINE. The editor-in-chief is Renée Schroeder (University of Vienna).

Wikipedia initiative 
The journal launched a new section for descriptions of families of RNA molecules in December 2008 and requires contributing authors to also submit a draft article on the RNA family for publication in Wikipedia. The journal submits the draft article to peer review and then publish it in Wikipedia. This initiative is a collaboration between the journal and the consortium that produces the Rfam database of RNA families.

Abstracting and indexing 
The journal is abstracted and indexed in:

According to the Journal Citation Reports, the journal has a 2021 impact factor of 4.766.

References

External links 
 

RNA
Biochemistry journals
Taylor & Francis academic journals
Quarterly journals
Publications established in 2004
English-language journals